Erlan Abdyldayev is a Kyrgyz diplomat who served as the Minister of Foreign Affairs of Kyrgyzstan from 2012 to 2018.

Biography

Abdyldayev was born on June 21, 1966, in Alma-Ata, the capital of the Kazakh SSR. In 1989 he graduated from the Moscow State Institute of International Relations. He worked in the embassies of Russia, and China from 1989 to 1994. In 2001, he was appointed Ambassador Extraordinary and Plenipotentiary of Kyrgyzstan to China, and the non-resident ambassador to Mongolia, Singapore, Thailand. On September 6, 2012, president Almazbek Atambayev appointed him Minister of Foreign Affairs of Kyrgyzstan. He was replaced in October 2018 by the Kyrgyz Ambassador to Japan, Chingiz Aidarbekov.

Personal life 
His father  (1933–2013) was a Soviet and Kyrgyz filmmaker. He is Married with one son. He speaks Russian, Chinese, and English as well as his native Kyrgyz.

Awards 
 Order of Friendship (April 2017)
 Honorary Doctor of Moscow State Institute of International Relations (October 2012)
 Honorary Member of the MGIMO Alumni Association

See also
Ministry of Foreign Affairs (Kyrgyzstan)

References

External links

1966 births
Foreign ministers of Kyrgyzstan
Living people
People from Almaty